The European Challenge was a non-ranking snooker tournament staged between 1991 and 1993. In its first two years it was held in Waregem, Belgium and for its third year it was held in Epernay in France. All three editions were sponsored by Canal Plus.

Winners

References

European Challenge
Snooker non-ranking competitions
Recurring sporting events established in 1991
Recurring events disestablished in 1993
Defunct snooker competitions